Philip Roy Warman (born 18 December 1950) is an English footballer who played as a left back in the Football League.

References

External links

1950 births
Living people
English footballers
Footballers from Bromley
Association football defenders
Charlton Athletic F.C. players
Millwall F.C. players
English Football League players